BNP Youth (formerly Young BNP, BNP Crusaders, Resistance, Youth BNP, BNP Youth and YBNP) is the youth section of the far-right British National Party (BNP).

History
In 2002, the Young BNP chairman Mark Collett chose the Odal rune as the logo for his organisation, then described as the "Young BNP", which Channel 4's Young, Nazi and Proud noted was used by the Nazis and sections of the Schutzstaffel (SS). In 2010, it was renamed "BNP Crusaders" and aimed at the slightly older demographic of 18–30 years of age. In 2011, it changed its name to "Resistance". The group falls under the arm of the British Nationalist Youth Movement with other groups such as BNP Students. The YBNP claimed to be a civil rights movement and student pressure group for indigenous British students from sixth form onwards.

Student BNP
Student BNP was part of the British Nationalist Youth Movement along with YBNP. In 2010, Student BNP closed down and BNP Crusaders was formed in replacement.

Leadership
 Until 2002: Mark Collett
 2003 – 2004: Tony Wentworth
 2004 – 2005: Jenny Griffin
 2006 – 2007: Danny Lake
 2008 – 2010: Mike Howson
 2010 – 2011: Kieren Trent
 2011 – 2014: Kevin Layzell
 2014 - 2015: Jack Andrew Renshaw

References

External links
 BNP website

Organisations associated with the British National Party
BNP, Young
Youth wings of fascist parties